Koper is a surname. Notable people with the surname include:

 Andrzej Koper (born 1953), Polish rally driver
 Antoni Koper (1906–1990), Polish World War II resistance fighter
 Brittany Koper (born 1985), American whistleblower
 Bud Koper (born 1942), American basketball player
 Christopher S. Koper, American professor
 Janet Koper (1931–1988), Canadian politician
 Peter Koper (born 1947), American writer and professor

See also
 

Polish-language surnames